Leif Zeilon, also known as Leif Ericsson, is a former Swedish politician, and is one of the founders of the Sweden Democrats and Bevara Sverige Svenskt.

During the 1970s he was active in Demokratisk Allians (DA), which was a reaction to the communist demonstrations for a North Vietnamese invasion of South Vietnam. In 1988 he was one of the founders as well as the leaders of the populist party Sweden Democrats and wrote its program. In 1995 he left Sweden Democrats and according to some sources founded Hembygdspartiet.

References

Literature 

Living people
Sweden Democrats politicians
1950 births
20th-century Swedish politicians